Aleksandr Matveyev or Matveev may refer to:
 Aleksandr Matveyev (artist) (1926—2008), Russian theater artist, painter, professor, and lighting specialist
Aleksandr Matveyev (linguist) (1926–2010), Russian linguist
Alexander Matveev (rower), competitor in rowing at the 2020 Summer Olympics
Aleksandr Matveyev (sculptor) ((1878–1960), Russian sculptor